The Ireland and South Africa rugby union teams have a rivalry dating back to 1906. The Springboks of South Africa have dominated their early meetings, with the Irish winning just once prior to 2004, but results have turned in Ireland's favour since then. In 2016, Ireland achieved their first test victory against the Springboks in South Africa with a 26–20 victory in Cape Town. Since 2022, South Africa are the only major Southern Hemisphere team over which Ireland has not achieved a series victory.

The teams' meeting on 6 November 2010 was the first Ireland Test at their new home of Aviva Stadium, where Ireland lost 23–21.

2004 Ireland rugby union tour of South Africa
Ireland travelled to South Africa in June 2004, having won their first Triple Crown since 1985, and beaten the champions of the 2003 Rugby World Cup, England in their first home game since the final. As a result, the Irish manager, Eddie O'Sullivan, was confident that Ireland would achieve their first win over South Africa in 39 years, their only previous victory having come in Dublin in 1965.

By contrast, South Africa had just changed their coach to Jake White and he had radically changed the team for his first test since taking charge of the Springboks. The first of the two game test series was played at altitude in Bloemfontein and South Africa eventually won the match 31–17, despite the scores being level at 11-all at half time.

The second match was played in the Newlands Stadium in Cape Town, and was a closer affair. However, South Africa maintained their unbeaten record against Ireland on home soil by winning 26–17.

2004 Autumn Internationals
The two teams were to meet again in November 2004 when South Africa toured the UK and Ireland, playing each of the home nations. In the lead-up to the match, South African coach Jake White provided additional motivation to the Irish team by publicly repeating his statement from earlier in the year that "only three Irish players would be good enough to get onto the South African team".

The game's only try was scored in controversial circumstances by Irish fly-half Ronan O'Gara. In the 21st minute, New Zealand referee Paul Honiss awarded Ireland a penalty inside the South African 22 and told John Smit to go and talk to his players regarding their repeated infringements at the break-down. While Smit's back was turned and the Springbok players were being called into a huddle, O'Gara took a quick tap and ran in for five points. John Smit protested but the try stood. O'Gara missed the conversion, but was to make up for it with a drop goal from 35 meters 12 minutes later. Percy Montgomery put the first points on the board for South Africa on 26 minutes, but missed a second effort shortly afterwards. Ireland led 8–3 at the break.

O'Gara continued his success with the boot three minutes after the start of the second half with a penalty to stretch the Irish lead to 11–3. Montgomery quickly responded in kind, but shortly afterwards Schalk Burger was sin-binned for the second week in a row, which allowed Ronan O'Gara to increase the Irish lead to 14–6. A late tackle on Irish skipper Brian O'Driscoll allowed O'Gara to increase the margin between the teams to 17-6. Percy Montgomery landed two more penalties, but Ireland hung on to win only their second victory over the Springboks, 17–12.

John Smit claims that Paul Honiss approached him after the match to apologise for the mistake regarding Ronan O'Gara’s try. A few months after the incident Paul Honiss apologised publicly on South African radio for his mistake.

2006 Autumn Internationals
On Saturday, November the 11th, 2006, the Springboks came to Lansdowne Road with an experimental side, including three debutants in the back three. The team was selected by head coach Jake White as a way of blooding players for the 2007 Rugby World Cup, and South Africa's urgent need to develop new players in the lead up to that tournament. By contrast, Ireland's coach, Eddie O'Sullivan chose Ireland's strongest available team, hoping to take a prized southern hemisphere scalp and boost his team's morale.

The day of the match was a clear, wintry day, but as the late kick off time of 5pm approached, the infamous 'swirling winds of Lansdowne Road' began to blow. South Africa won the toss and chose to play into the wind in the first half, starting the game with a fine display of running rugby. On their first visit to the Irish half, they returned with points as their out half André Pretorius kicked a penalty into the wind. The Irish responded with a barging run by Denis Leamy who made the hard yards before passing to Ronan O'Gara, who then passed back inside to Andrew Trimble who found his way over for Ireland's first points.

From there, Ireland scored two more tries and ended the first half 22–3 ahead. South Africa played better in the second half and debutant winger François Steyn showed good pace to score in the corner, but Pretorius failed to convert the try. Bryan Habana who usually plays at winger, but who played this match in the position of outside center, showed his speed and guile by scoring a remarkable solo try. Any thoughts of a South African revival were stamped out when Girvan Dempsey set up Shane Horgan for a try in the 76th minute. Ronan O'Gara scored the last points of the match with the conversion for a final score of 32–15.

For the 2006 November Test against Ireland the Springboks wore an exact replica of the jersey that was worn by the touring side captained by Paul Roos in 1906. It was on this tour that the name 'Springboks' was coined. The kit consisted of a green jersey with a white collar, blue shorts and blue socks. Sponsors Sasol did not appear on the jersey. The strip was a part of South African rugby's centenary celebrations.

Summary

Overall

Records
Note: Date shown in brackets indicates when the record was or last set.

Attendance
Up to date as of 5 November 2022

Results

List of series

References

External links

Ireland national rugby union team matches
South Africa national rugby union team matches